Poovaiyar is an Indian gaana singer and actor who works in Tamil-language films. He is known for being a part of Star Vijay's Super Singer Junior and co-singing "Verithanam" from Bigil (2019).

Career 
Poovaiyar participated and became the second runner up of Super Singer Junior 6. He sang a song in Natpe Thunai (2019) along with Hiphop Tamizha Aadhi. Poovaiyar co-sang the song "Verithanam" in the film Bigil (2019) with Vijay and Sangeetha Rajeshwaran in addition to appearing in the song.  Poovaiyar sang the song "Kolamav Kokkila" in the film 50/50 (2019). The film picturizes Yogi Babu and is inspired by the song "Kalyaana Vayasu" from Kolamavu Kokila. He later appeared in Master (2021), and has been signed to play a role in the films Andhagan and Cobra.

Discography

Filmography 
All films are in Tamil, unless otherwise noted.

Television

References

External links 

Kolamav Kokkila making video

21st-century Indian singers
21st-century Indian male singers
Indian male playback singers
Living people
Tamil playback singers
Year of birth missing (living people)